Jalan Tanjung Pengelih (Johor state route J52) is a major road in Johor, Malaysia.

List of junctions

References 

Roads in Johor